Warren Leslie Forrest (born June 29, 1949) is an American murderer and accused serial killer. Convicted and sentenced to two life terms for the murders of a young woman and teenage girl in Clark County, Washington, in 1974, he is considered the prime suspect in at least five similar murders and disappearances dating back to 1971. 

Forrest has been incarcerated on a single murder count since 1974, and was convicted on another count in 2023 after DNA linked him to the murder of Martha Morrison. He is yet to be charged in any of the other crimes he has been linked to.

Early life 
Warren Leslie Forrest was born on June 29, 1949, in Vancouver, Washington, the younger of two brothers of parents Harold and Delores Forrest. He came from a respected family, attended the Fort Vancouver High School and played in the school's track and field team, of which he became the captain. After graduating in September 1967, Forrest and his older brother Marvin were drafted to fight in the Vietnam War, where the former served as a fire control crewman for the 15th Field Artillery Regiment at the Homestead Air Force Base in Homestead, Florida. 

After his discharge, he returned to Vancouver and married his high school sweetheart Sharon Ann Hart in August 1969, with whom he would have two children. Shortly after their marriage, they moved to Fort Bliss, Texas, and then to Newport Beach, California, where Forrest enrolled at the North American School of Conservation and Ecology. However, he quickly lost interest in studying and dropped out at the end of the first term. In late 1970, Forrest and his wife moved to Battle Ground, Washington, where he found a job for the Clark County Parks Department.

Exposure

Investigation and arrest 
On October 2, 1974, Forrest was arrested on charges of kidnapping, rape and attempted murder. On the previous day, he had met 20-year-old Daria Wightman in Portland, Oregon and lured her into his car under the pretense of doing a photo shoot. Instead, he drove to a city park and assaulted her, raping Wightman several times, torturing her and shooting her with darts from an air-powered dart gun. Forrest then drove her to Camas, Washington, where he stabbed her six times with a knife near Lacamas Lake and attempted to strangle her. 

Wightman fell unconscious after the attack, and as Forrest believed she had died, he completely undressed her and threw her into some nearby bushes. However, Wightman woke up two hours later and managed to make her way to the city, where she was found by passers-by. She was driven to a nearby hospital and given emergency medical attention, thanks to which she survived. Once in a stable condition, she provided a description of her assailant and the distinctive features of his car - according to her testimony, he drove a blue 1973 Ford van and had greeted several park employees while driving through the area. As the park was under the Parks Department's jurisdiction, police assumed that the perpetrator was an employee and started looking into their alibis.

The examination revealed that Forrest was absent from work on the day of the attack, being on sick leave. As he owned a 1973 blue Ford van and matched the perpetrator's description very well, police obtained a search warrant for his home and vehicle. While searching his home, officers found jewelry and clothing fragments that belonged to Daria Wightman, who also conclusively identified him as her attacker once she was presented a photograph of him. Forrest was unable to provide himself with a convincing alibi, and was charged that same day. 

Soon after his arrest was publicized, the local police department was contacted by 15-year-old Norma Jean Countryman, who stated that she had also been assaulted by Forrest. According to her testimony, on July 17, she was attempting to hitchhike out of Ridgefield and voluntarily got into Forrest's van after he offered her a ride. During said ride, she was raped and beaten, and after reaching the slopes of Tukes Mountain, she was bound, gagged and tied to a tree. Forrest intended to kill her, but Countryman managed to chew through the gag and hide in some nearby bushes until the morning, when she came out of hiding and looked for help. Despite her testimony, Forrest was solely charged with the kidnapping and attempted murder of Wightman. His legal team soon filed a motion for a psychiatric evaluation, which determined that Forrest was legally insane. He was thus acquitted by reason of insanity and ordered to undergo treatment at the Western State Hospital in Lakewood.

Indictment for murder of Krista Blake 
On July 16, 1976, Portland residents James T. Mcardle and Pete O'Donnell went to pick mushrooms and wildflowers in Tukes Mountain near Battle Ground, noticing a small brown shoe sticking out of some bushes. When they pulled it, the pair saw a skeletal leg and reported the find to the local police, who unearthed the of half-skeletonized body of a young woman. Forensic examination of the jaw led scientists to determine that the remains belonged to 20-year-old Krista Kay Blake, a hitchhiker who had gone missing from Vancouver on July 11, 1974. Witnesses claimed that prior to her disappearance, she had gotten into a 1973 blue Ford driven by a young white male whom they did not recognize. As Forrest had the exact same van, he came under suspicion in not only Blake's, but the disappearances and murders of at least six teenagers and young women who had been abducted from Clark County between 1971 and 1974. Almost all of them hitchhiked and were seen entering a van before vanishing. A closer look at Blake's clothes led to the discovery of holes on her T-shirt, which investigators belived were made by a dart gun similar to the one Forrest used in the Wightman case.

During the investigation, police determined that on the day Blake had disappeared, Forrest was not working and had no alibi. His mother claimed that he had spent part of the day at her house, but left early in the evening and did not return home until the following morning. Since Blake's clothes and bones showed no signs of stab wounds or bullet holes, the medical examiner concluded that she had likely been strangled. Based on this highly circumstantial evidence and not entirely reliable testimony, Forrest was charged with her murder in 1978. Although he had been detained at a mental institution, Forrest and his attorney Don Greig filed a petition for another examination, claiming that his mental state had improved greatly and that Forrest wanted to represent himself at trial. His request was granted, and Forrest was allowed to stand trial.

Initially, four judges that had been involved with Forrest's previous trials were disqualified on the grounds of being potentially biased either in favor or against him. This decision was eventually resolved, and Justice Robert D. McMullen was appointed as the trial judge.

Trial for the murder of Blake 
Forrest's trial began in early 1979, but a mistrial was declared after Forrest's attorney erroneously allowed a second dart gun unrelated to the case be submitted in as evidence. His defense team filed a motion for a change of venue from Clark County to Cowlitz County, arguing that the intense publicity surrounding the murders would prejudice the jurors against their client. The motion was granted, and the trial resumed in April 1979 at a court in Cowlitz County.

During the proceedings, Forrest pleaded not guilty, claiming that he had been on vacation to Long Beach with his wife and kids. His alibi was unexpectedly confirmed by his mother, who said he had been at home at the time when investigators supposed Blake had gotten into the van. However, her testimony was deemed unreliable, as prosecutors pointed out that she had originally told investigators that her son left the house in the early evening and did not return until the following morning. Forrest's wife Sharon also testified in his defense - although she admitted that their marriage had been rocky and that he sometimes suffered from blackouts, she insisted that he had been with her the entire time and never showed indication of being violent towards women.

During the various court hearings, multiple witnesses testified against Forrest, stating that he had been seen with the victim at different times and was acquainted with her. Some of the witnesses' claims were questioned by the defense team, as two of them had given descriptions of the suspected killer's vehicle that did not match the one Forrest was using.

At one court hearing, Forrest's surviving victims - Daria Wightman and Norma Countryman - took the stand and identified him as their assailant. The defendant himself had pleaded guilty to the kidnapping and attempted murder of Wightman, claiming that he had done so while suffering under the effects of his PTSD, but categorically refused to admit guilt in the murder of Blake and the kidnapping of Countryman. The prosecutor's office, in turn, insisted that he was guilty of all charges, as each crime matched his modus operandi. In the end, despite some conflicting evidence and inconsistent testimonies, Forrest was found guilty and sentenced to life imprisonment with a chance of parole.

Following his conviction, he was transferred to the Washington State Penitentiary in Walla Walla to serve out his life term. Forrest filed an appeal in early 1982, but it was denied in October of that year. He has since filed numerous parole applications over the years, all of which have been unsuccessful due to the fact he was suspected in other violent crimes.

Serial murder accusations 
Ever since his initial convictions, Forrest has remained a suspect in multiple kidnappings, disappearances and murders committed in Clark County during the early 1970s. He has refused to cooperate with investigators out of fear of further prosecution, and the facts of the criminal cases and his involvement in them have become increasingly confusing over the years.

In 2017, at yet another parole hearing, Forrest unexpectedly confessed to murdering Krista Blake and the kidnappings of Daria Wightman and Norma Countryman. He stated that at the time of her murder, Blake had been deeply depressed, severely stressed and suffering from the effects of a mental illness  - he claimed that he did not intend to kill her at first, but eventually did it because she attempted to escape. He also candidly confessed to a total of 16 crimes involving women between 1971 and 1974, ranging from voyeurism to murder. In spite of this, he claimed that he had killed nobody else besides Blake, and that he was remorseful for his actions. Despite his admissions, his application was denied and he was prohibited from filing further appeals until March 2022. The Parole Board stated that he continued to pose a danger to society and made minimal progress in ammeliorating his behavior.

Trial and conviction for the murder of Martha Morrison 
In December 2019, Forrest was charged with the murder of 17-year-old Martha Morrison, who went missing from Portland, Oregon in September 1974. Her skeletal remains were discovered on October 12 of that year in Clark County, eight miles from Tukes Mountain, where Krista Blake's body was found - however, authorities at the time were unable to positively identify her and she was known simply as a Jane Doe. In 2010, her half-brother Michael Morrison contacted police in Eugene so he could to submit his DNA sample. In 2014, investigators began examining physical evidence from Forrest's criminal case to determine if it could be used in unsolved crimes.

Forensic experts from the Washington State Police Crime Lab isolated a partial DNA profile from bloodstains found on Forrest's dart gun and cross-referenced them with Morrison's DNA, leading to the positive identification of Martha's remains. Consequently, Forrest was identified as her killer.

In January 2020, the 70-year-old Forrest was extradited back to Clark County to await charges in Morrison's murder. He appeared in court for the first time in 40 years on February 7, pleading not guilty. The trial was scheduled to begin on April 6, but was delayed several times due to the COVID-19 pandemic.

The trial finally resumed in early 2023, and on February 1, a jury found Forrest guilty of the murder of Martha Morrison. Sixteen days later, he was handed down another life sentence. During the proceedings, he was still apprehensive about admitting his guilt, but expressed his opinion that girls from socially disadvantaged environments should not hitchhike or get into cars with strangers due to their vulnerable disposition.

Suspected victims 
Besides Blake and Morrison, Forrest remains the prime suspect in the disappearances and murders of at least five teenagers and young women. In each case, the perpetrator exhibited a similar modus operandi to Forrest.

The list includes the following victims:
 Jamie Rochelle Grissim (16): student at the Fort Vancouver High School who went missing while walking home from school on December 7, 1971. During the subsequent search for her, policemen found a number of her personal belongings, her purse and ID card in Dole Valley. It was initially believed that she ran away and left the state, but she has not been located to this day. Since Martha Morrison and Carol Valenzuela (see below) were later found buried not far from where her personal belongings were found, local authorities have reassessed their conclusions and now believed that Grissim was abducted and killed by Forrest.
 Barbara Ann Derry (18): went missing on February 11, 1972. She was last seen on a highway trying to hitchhike from Vancouver to Goldendale, where she had moved to attend college. Her body was discovered on March 29 at the bottom of a silo inside the Cedar Creek Grist Mill. Derry had died from a stab wound to her chest area.
 Diane Gilchrist (14): missing since May 29, 1974. A ninth grade student at the Shumway Junior High School who had never exhibited problematic behavior, Gilchrist's parents claimed that she had left their home in downtown Vancouver through her bedroom window on the second floor and then vanished into the night. She has never been found, and her fate remains unclear.
 Gloria Nadine Knutson (19): went missing on May 31, 1974. A 12th-grader at the Hudson Bay High School, Knutson had been invited to a housewarming party but declined, opting to instead visit a nightclub called "Red Caboose", where she was seen by several acquaintances. One witness told police that Knutson sought his help in the early morning, claiming that somebody had attempted to rape her and was now stalking her. The man claimed that she had asked him to drive her home, but his car was out of gas. Distraught, Knutson decided to walk home and disappeared soon after. Her skeletal remains were discovered by a fisherman in a forested area near Lacamas Lake on May 9, 1978.
 Carol Platt Valenzuela (20): went missing on August 4, 1974, while hitchhiking from Camas to Vancouver. A married mother of two infant children, she was not known to be involved in prostitution or to have a criminal record. On October 12, her skeletal remains were discovered by a hunter in the Dole Valley outside of Vancouver, very close to those of Morrison. Due to this, authorities believe that Forrest likely killed both.

References 

1949 births
Living people
20th-century American criminals
American male criminals
Suspected serial killers
American murderers of children
American rapists
American kidnappers
American people convicted of murder
People convicted of murder by Washington (state)
American people convicted of rape
American people convicted of kidnapping
American people convicted of attempted murder
American prisoners sentenced to life imprisonment
Prisoners sentenced to life imprisonment by Washington (state)
People acquitted by reason of insanity
American prisoners and detainees
Prisoners and detainees of Washington (state)
Violence against women in the United States
Criminals from Washington (state)
People from Vancouver, Washington